Yuba is a small unincorporated community in the Lower Peninsula of the U.S. state of Michigan. Yuba is a part of Grand Traverse County, and is located in Acme Township along U.S. Highway 31. Yuba rests on the eastern shore of Lake Michigan's Grand Traverse Bay.

History 
Yuba was first settled in by David R. Curtis in 1852. A post office was open in Yuba from 1865 to 1904. The nearby village of Fife Lake was named for William H. Fife, the first postmaster at Yuba.

Geography 
Yuba lies on the shore of the East Arm off Grand Traverse Bay, a bay of Lake Michigan. US Highway 31 runs directly through Yuba, and can be used to access Elk Rapids and Traverse City.

References 

Unincorporated communities in Grand Traverse County, Michigan
Unincorporated communities in Michigan
Michigan populated places on Lake Michigan
Populated places established in 1852
1852 establishments in Michigan